Mineral Springs is a city in Howard County, Arkansas, United States. The population was 1,208 at the 2010 census.

Geography
Mineral Springs is located in southern Howard County at  (33.876358, -93.918599). Arkansas Highway 27 runs through the center of town, leading northeast  to Nashville, the county seat, and west  to Ben Lomond. Arkansas Highway 355 joins Highway 27 on Runnels Street through the center of Mineral Springs, but it leads north  to Center Point and south  to Tollette.

Demographics

2020 census

As of the 2020 United States census, there were 1,085 people, 470 households, and 315 families residing in the city.

2000 census
As of the census of 2000, there were 1,264 people, 466 households, and 354 families residing in the city. The racial makeup of the city was 51.19% White, 41.46% Black or African American, 0.16% Native American, 0.08% Asian, 5.78% from other races, and 1.34% from two or more races.  10.92% of the population were Hispanic or Latino of any race.

There were 466 households, out of which 40.3% had children under the age of 18 living with them, 51.7% were married couples living together, 19.7% had a female householder with no husband present, and 24.0% were non-families. 20.8% of all households were made up of individuals, and 10.7% had someone living alone who was 65 years of age or older.  The average household size was 2.71 and the average family size was 3.07.

In the city, the population was spread out, with 30.5% under the age of 18, 7.8% from 18 to 24, 29.5% from 25 to 44, 20.8% from 45 to 64, and 11.4% who were 65 years of age or older.  The median age was 33 years. For every 100 females, there were 92.1 males.  For every 100 females age 18 and over, there were 83.9 males.

The median income for a household in the city was $29,853, and the median income for a family was $31,150. Males had a median income of $24,286 versus $16,775 for females. The per capita income for the city was $12,477.  About 16.2% of families and 21.1% of the population were below the poverty line, including 26.5% of those under age 18 and 14.8% of those age 65 or over.

Education 
Public education of early childhood, elementary and secondary school students is provided by the Mineral Springs Saratoga School District, which leads to graduation from Mineral Springs High School.

Notable people

Willie Davis, born in Mineral Springs, Major League Baseball player
William T. Dillard, founder of Dillard's; born in Mineral Springs

References

External links
Mineral Springs School District

Cities in Arkansas
Cities in Howard County, Arkansas